XV Corps, or 15 Corps, also known as Chinar Corps, is a Corps of the Indian Army which is presently located in Srinagar and responsible for military operations in the Kashmir Valley. It has participated in all military conflicts with Pakistan and China till date. Lieutenant General Amardeep Singh Aujla is its current Corps Commander since 9 May 2022 taking over from Lieutenant General Devendra Pratap Pandey.

History
HQ XV Corps was first raised in Egypt at Port Said on January 12, 1916 under the command of Lieutenant General Sir Henry Horne. It was part of the British Indian Army during the First World War for operations in Egypt and France. Disbanded in 1918, it was re-raised on March 20, 1942, at Barrackpore for combat operations in Burma during World War II, and after the war, it served in Java and Sumatra.

Disbanded in Karachi in 1947 after repatriation, it was re-raised after India gained independence, as part of the Indian Army, in 1948 as HQ Jammu and Kashmir Force. It underwent a number of name changes till its final re-designation as HQ 15 Corps in 1955 in Udhampur. In June 1972, HQ Northern Command was raised to take over operational control of Jammu & Kashmir. HQ 15 Corps moved to Srinagar to take charge of the Kashmir Valley and Ladakh. After Operation Vijay, HQ 15 Corps was made solely responsible for military operations in the Kashmir Valley.

Formation Sign
The design consists of the 'red-white-red background' depicting a corps of the Indian Army with a Chinar leaf and a battle axe superimposed on it.

Composition
The corps currently consists of:

19th Mountain Division (Dagger Division) headquartered at Baramulla
28th Infantry Division (Vajr Division) headquartered at Kupwara
Kilo Force, Victor Force and Delta Force of the Rashtriya Rifles come under the operational control of the corps

List of Commanders / General Officer Commanding (GOC)

Notes

References

External links

Further reading
Richard A. Renaldi and Ravi Rikhe, 'Indian Army Order of Battle,' Orbat.com for Tiger Lily Books: A division of General Data LLC, 2011.

015
Military units and formations established in 1947
1947 establishments in India